(also shortened to ) were Japanese women who followed Westernized fashions and lifestyles in the period after World War I.

 were Japan's equivalent of America's flappers, Germany's , France's , or China's . By viewing  through a Japanese versus Western lens, the nationalist press could use the modern girl archetype to blame such failings as frivolity, sexual promiscuity, and selfishness on foreign influence. The period was characterized by the emergence of working class young women with access to money and consumer goods. Using aristocratic culture as their standard of Japaneseness, the critics of the modern girl condemned her working class traits as "unnatural" for Japanese. Modern girls were depicted as living in the cities, being financially and emotionally independent, choosing their own suitors, and apathetic towards politics. The woman's magazine was a novelty at this time, and the modern girl was the model consumer, someone more often found in advertisements for cosmetics and fashion than in real life. The all-female Takarazuka Revue, established in 1914, and the novel Naomi (1924) are outstanding examples of modern girl culture.

Origins and etymology

Jun'ichirō Tanizaki's 1924 novel Naomi is credited as creating the term "modern girl". The novel was such a hit that it caused considerable outrage among elders in Japan. However, younger women embraced the story and celebrated the values displayed by several of the main characters. The character became a feature of many silent films produced in Japan at the time by directors like Yasujirō Ozu. Actresses such as Tatsuta Shizue became known for their depiction of modern girls in contrast to the more traditional values depicted by other characters in films.

Behavior
The values of modern girls emphasised complete financial and emotional independence. Modern girls would work service industry-style jobs and live on their own, not dependent on their family. They smoked, watched movies, and hung out at the cafes; they were sexually liberated, choosing their own suitors. Many of them participated in casual sex. In a 1928 short story by Kataoka Teppei, a young typist dates three "modern boys" at the same time. She is described as decadent, hedonistic, and superficial.

However, the ideals of modern girls were not considered to be politically-driven, nor did young women adopt modern girl values and behaviours as a direct form of protest. Instead, modern girls sought change via themselves, with consumerism the first and foremost consideration and driving factor. Modern girls constantly shopped at the new department stores and listened to jazz records.

Appearance

A modern girl's appearance was completely Western. Modern girls wore pumps and short dresses, discarding the kimono and traditional hairstyles for Western-style "garçonne" looks; similar to flappers, the bob cut was immensely popular among modern girls, who also openly wore lipstick. Much of their dress and appearance resembled Western film stars such as Olive Thomas, Clara Bow, and Mary Pickford. Pickford is used as a symbol of modernism in Naomi.

End of era
The modern girl was a symbol of Westernization, and a symbol of extravagance and self-centred choices. However, following military coups in the mid- to late 1930s, extreme Japanese nationalism, the Great Depression and the Second Sino-Japanese War, the popularity of Western fashion, ideals and entertainment declined sharply. The decline of the modern girl, previously driven by the use of disposable income on consumerism and shopping, was only exacerbated further by the severe rationing of World War II. Following World War II, the developments of post-war Japan prompted a return to the 19th century ideal of "good wife, wise mother".

See also

 New Woman
 
 , a popular 1970s manga and anime series by Waki Yamato in which the lead character, Hanamura Benio, is a "modern girl," or "-san" ("Miss High-Collar")

References

Further reading
 The Gender/Sexuality Reader: Culture, History, Political Economy, Vintage Books
 The New Japanese Woman: Modernity, Media, and Women in Interwar Japan
 Dunn, Michael, Taisho Chic: Modern girls and outrage, The Japan Times,  May 10, 2007.
 The Modern Girl Around the World: Consumption, Modernity, and Globalization Edited by Alys Eve Weinbaum, Lynn M. Thomas, Priti Ramamurthy, Uta G. Poiger, Modeleine Yue Dong, and Tani E. Barlow
Silverberg, Miriam (1991). "The Modern Girl as Militant." in Gail Bernstein, Recreating Japanese Women: 1600-1945. pp 239–66.

External links

Slang terms for women
1920s fashion
Japanese culture
1920s in Japan
Flappers
Stereotypes of working-class women